The Abyssinian grass rat (Arvicanthis abyssinicus)  is a species of rodent in the family Muridae. It is found in Ethiopia. Its natural habitats are subtropical or tropical high-altitude grassland, arable land, and pastureland.

References

 

Endemic fauna of Ethiopia
Arvicanthis
Mammals of Ethiopia
Mammals described in 1842
Taxonomy articles created by Polbot